Curt Taylor is an American politician who has served in the Vermont House of Representatives since 2017.

References

Living people
Beloit College alumni
Washington State University alumni
21st-century American politicians
Democratic Party members of the Vermont House of Representatives
People from Monmouth County, New Jersey
Year of birth missing (living people)